Vedalai is a village in Ramanathapuram district, Tamil Nadu state in southern India.

Geography
Vedalai is bordered by the Paak River to the north and Gulf of Mannar to the south. Sundaramudaiyan (S.Madai) village lies to the west and Maraikkayar Pattinam to the east. Vedalai is 13 km2(approx) in size. It lies in 9.26' Latitude and 79.11' Longitude.

In south of the Gulf of Mannar there are two islands lies between 2 km from Vedalai. This islands have many extinct species and rare living organisms so it is declared as a reserved area called "Gulf of Mannar National Park" and carefully monitored by the Forest Department.

Pillaimadam is near Vedalai.

Economy 
Many years ago, fishing was the main source of income in Vedalai. In recent years, however, people are going to the Gulf countries to make money.

Seafood export and seafood preserving also contribute to the income of the people.

Education

Private schools 
Infant Jesus Matriculation School
Al Ameen Nursery and Primary school
Sethu Vidyalaya
Raja Matriculation Higher Secondary School and Arts College

Government school 
 Elementary and Govt Higher secondary school.

Villages in Ramanathapuram district